Los Corralitos is a census-designated place (CDP) in Webb County, Texas, United States. This was a new CDP for the 2010 census with a population of 35.

Geography
Los Corralitos is located at  (27.641193, -99.557476).

Education
Residents are in the United Independent School District. Zoned schools include: Julia Bird Jones Muller Elementary School, George Washington Middle School, and United High School.

The designated community college for Webb County is Laredo Community College.

References

Census-designated places in Webb County, Texas
Census-designated places in Texas